is a 2004 Japanese anime film written, produced, cinematographed, directed and edited by Makoto Shinkai in his feature film debut. Set over several years in an alternate history where the Soviet Union occupies half of Japan, it follows two childhood friends who grow apart after one of their friends disappears. As international tensions rise and a mysterious tower built by the Union starts replacing matter around it with matter from other universes, they cross paths once again and realize their missing friend might be the key to saving the world.

Unlike his short film Voices of a Distant Star, which was largely made by Shinkai on his own, The Place Promised in Our Early Days is a full-scale production, as reflected by its better animation quality and longer running time. It has been broadcast across Japan by the anime satellite television network Animax. It was licensed for North American release by ADV Films and is now licensed by GKIDS.

It was one of Makoto Shinkai’s films to be selected to be screened at the Japanese film festival in India as part of celebrations of 70th anniversary of establishment of India Japan diplomatic relations.

Plot

After the Separation of Japan in 1945, the northern island of Hokkaidō (or Ezo, as it is called in the anime) is occupied by the "Union" (referring to the Soviet Union). In 1974, the Union begins the construction of a strange tower on Hokkaido designed by a scientist named Ekusun Tsukinoe. The anime follows the story of three friends living in Aomori, in northern Japan: two boys, Hiroki Fujisawa and Takuya Shirakawa, both child prodigies; and one girl, Sayuri Sawatari. In 1996, the three are in ninth grade, their last year of middle school, and they are fascinated by the Hokkaido Tower visible across the Tsugaru Strait to the north. Sayuri becomes close friends with the two boys.

The boys find a crashed Maritime Self-Defense Force drone aircraft and work on rebuilding the plane with the support of Mr. Okabe, their boss at a military plant. The three teenagers promise to one day fly to Hokkaido to visit the Tower. However, before they can do this, Sayuri mysteriously disappears during the summer.

Three years later, Takuya and Hiroki have stopped working on the plane, having taken different paths after the grief they suffered at Sayuri's disappearance. Takuya is working as a physicist at an Alliance scientific facility sponsored by the United States' National Security Agency, researching parallel universes alongside Ms. Maki Kasahara under the supervision of Professor Tomizawa. They know that the Hokkaido Tower, which began operating in 1996, replaces matter around it with matter from other universes, but they do not yet know why it does this for only a 2-km radius. Takuya becomes involved with the Uilta Liberation Front after he learns that Mr. Okabe is its leader; his factory workers are the other agents of the organization. Okabe signs Takuya on for an excursion to Ezo with Uilta.

Sayuri is revealed to have been hospitalized over the past three years, having developed an extreme form of narcolepsy; she has been sleeping continuously for most of the three years. Her mind is trapped in an unpopulated parallel universe, where she is all alone. Tomizawa has discovered that she is somehow connected to the Union's research into parallel universes and the Hokkaido Tower's ability to change the surrounding land into alternate possibilities, but Tomizawa keeps this information, as well as her whereabouts, secret from Takuya initially. Tomizawa is secretly working with the Uilta Liberation Front and lets Mr. Okabe know about Sayuri, while Mr. Okabe reveals that the Uilta Liberation Front plans to bomb the Hokkaido Tower to incite war against the Union, hoping that this will lead to the reunification of Japan.

Takuya finally learns of the most likely scenario through his coworker – that Sayuri was used by her grandfather, a Union physicist, to channel all of the Tower's unstable dimension-creating energy somewhere other than Earth, the implication of him not having done so likely having resulted in the dimension creating chain reactions around the tower to continue growing in area until it enveloped the whole world. Saddened, he goes back to the old warehouse where he and Hiroki were working on the plane, only to find Hiroki, who wants Takuya to help him complete the plane to save Sayuri. He coldly points a gun at Hiroki and has him choose between Sayuri and the World without waiting for an answer – walking away in pain.

With Okabe's guidance, Takuya locks up his coworker and takes Sayuri away from the NSA compound – Takuya and Hiroki finally come back together to work on the plane. Takuya helps to finish the final programming of the plane, as they plan, using the cover of the soon coming declaration of war against Ezo, to fly to the tower and destroy it before its rays affect everything on Earth, which in turn will save Sayuri.

The plane only seats two, so Takuya allows Hiroki to pilot the plane and fulfill their childhood promise. Hiroki manages to fly the plane across the strait to the Tower carrying Sayuri and a missile provided by the Uilta Liberation Front. When Sayuri finally awakens while the plane circles the Tower, the Tower activates and immediately begins to transform the surrounding area; the area under transformation grows to encompass much of Hokkaido. In the last few minutes of her coma, Sayuri realizes that when she awakes she will lose all her memories of her dreams of the past 3 years, and thus upon waking she weeps because, unknowingly, she lost the memory of her love for Hiroki. Flying back, Hiroki fires the missile, destroying the Tower and stopping the matter transformation. The film ends with Hiroki vowing to Sayuri that they will start their relationship anew.

Cast

Allusions
The film includes several references to other literary works and themes, such as separation and dreams. It was written on the occasion of the premature death of his sister, Toshi Miyazawa (1898–1922). Furthermore, during the summer sequence in the film, Sayuri is seen reading a novel titled  by Morishita Sakae. Although the author is fictional, a book of the same name  exists by a similarly named poet, Hoshio Sakae.

A reference to the director's previous work is made when Takuya and Hiroki meet at the station. They see a cat which Takuya calls Chobi, the name of the cat from She and Her Cat.

Music

Theme song

Performed by Ai Kawashima
Lyrics by Makoto Shinkai
Music by Tenmon
Arranged by Tenmon

Original soundtrack

Awards
 Special Distinction (Feature Film category) – Seoul Comics and Animation Festival 2005
 Jury Selection in the 9th Japan Media Arts Festival
 Silver Prize on Best Animated Film Section (by audience choice) of Public Prize – Canada Fantasia Film Festival
 Award for Art in Seiun Award – 44th Japanese SF Convention
 Best Animated Film – Mainichi Film Awards 2004
 Award for Expression Technique (for Trailer #1) – Tokyo International Anime Fair 2003

DVD

Regular release
The Place Promised in Our Early Days (90 Minutes)
3 Video Interviews with Japanese Cast
Original Japanese Trailer Collection

Collector's edition

Disc 1 (DVD)
The Place Promised in Our Early Days (90 Minutes)
3 Video Interviews with Japanese Cast
Original Japanese Trailer Collection

Disc 2 (DVD)
The Place Promised in Our Early Days (Animated Storyboards, 90 Minutes)
Interview with Makoto Shinkai
Animated Gallery 2002 — 2004

Disc 3 (CDROM)
35 Still Images
Sheet Music

DVD Book
The Place Promised in Our Early Days (Storyboards, 360 pages)

Manga
The Place Promised in Our Early Days was also serialized as a manga in Monthly Afternoon. It began in February 2006 and ended in August 2006, with eight chapters. The story is by Makoto Shinkai and the art is by Mizu Sahara.

Novelisation
The Place Promised in Our Early Days has been novelised by Arata Kanoh.  There is an English translation by Taylor Engel.

Stage adaptation
The film was adapted into a stage play directed by Yuko Naito, with a script by Shigeki Motoiki and music by Masato Komata. It had seven performances from April 20–24, 2018 at Tokyo International Forum Hall C in Tokyo, and two performances on May 2, 2018 at NHK Osaka Hall in Osaka.

The cast included Yudai Tatsumi, Shô Takada, Momoka Ito, Kazuyuki Matsuzawa, Wataru Kozuki, Atsuko Asano.

References

External links
 
 
 
 The Place Promised in Our Early Days Review at Anime+ Podcast

2004 science fiction films
2004 anime films
2005 Japanese novels
ADV Films
Alternate history anime
Anime with original screenplays
Cold War films
CoMix Wave Films films
Films about the National Security Agency
Films directed by Makoto Shinkai
Films set in 1996
Films set in 1999
Films set in Aomori Prefecture
Films set in Hokkaido
Films set in Tokyo
Japanese alternate history films
Japanese animated science fiction films
Japanese aviation films
Japanese romance films
2000s Japanese-language films
Kodansha manga
Music in fiction
Seinen manga
Soviet Union in fiction
Works about aircraft
Yen Press titles